Innisfree Ltd is a fund management company based in the United Kingdom which manages substantial interests in private finance initiative (PFI) schemes in the UK, Canada, Sweden and The Netherlands. It invests funds in social infrastructure projects, such as hospitals and schools, on behalf of institutional investors such as local authority pension funds. The company has a portfolio of 56 projects with a capital value of over £18 billion.

Role
The company was founded by David Metter in 1995 and has raised over £2.3 billion to date .  Currently, it has over £1.7 billion under management in four long term income funds.  These funds have lives of 35 years or more which matches the length of a typical PFI contract of between 25 and 30 years and reflects Innisfree's policy to remain a long term partner in these projects.

The majority of Innisfree's investors are UK institutions with over 25% of funds from overseas.  Most of these investors are pension funds seeking long-term sustainable income.  Over 80% of Innisfree's commitments are to UK projects with the remainder located in Canada, The Netherlands and Sweden.  

The role of equity providers such as Innisfree in PFI projects is to ensure the delivery of public services infrastructure to a standard as set out by the public sector with financial penalties for non-performance.  Payment is only made once a facility is delivered and when the facility is operating as contractually stipulated.  The PFI unitary charge includes payments to cover the cost of capital expenditure, the services needed to run and repair that asset and, in certain circumstances, supporting soft services. If a project is built using conventional procurement, these future costs for services are not automatically covered, monitored or disclosed.

PFI schemes

National Health Service
The company is the largest external investor in NHS hospitals. Innisfree's health project clients include:

Barts Health NHS Trust
Derby Teaching Hospitals NHS Foundation Trust
University Hospital Coventry
St Helens and Knowsley Teaching Hospitals NHS Trust
Sherwood Forest Hospitals NHS Foundation Trust
Newcastle upon Tyne Hospitals NHS Foundation Trust
Maidstone and Tunbridge Wells NHS Trust
Norfolk and Norwich University Hospitals NHS Foundation Trust
South Tees Hospitals NHS Foundation Trust
Walsall Healthcare NHS Trust
King's College Hospital (formerly South London Healthcare NHS Trust)
Dartford and Gravesham NHS Trust
Lewisham and Greenwich NHS Trust (for Princess Royal University Hospital)
University Hospital of South Manchester NHS Foundation Trust
Hairmyres Hospital
Buckinghamshire Healthcare NHS Trust
Royal Berkshire NHS Foundation Trust
Taunton and Somerset NHS Foundation Trust

Defence
Project Allenby Connaught, at £1.8 billion, is one of the UK's largest PFI projects.  The 35-year contract with Aspire Defence was let in 2006. It involves servicing and refurbishment of buildings on 800 ha of army land around Salisbury Plain and in Aldershot. Aspire Defence Limited is 37.5% owned by "funds managed by Innisfree"; the other shareholders are InfraRed Capital Partners (17.5%) and KBR (45%).

References

External links
 Innisfree

Investment companies of the United Kingdom